Yuhan Su (蘇郁涵) is a jazz vibraphonist and composer based in New York City.  Born in Gongguan, Miaoli, Taiwan, she moved to Taipei when she was 18 and later to the United States from Taiwan in 2008 to study at Berklee College of Music.

Discography

As leader 
 Flying Alone (Inner Circle, 2008)
 with Rafael Aguiar on alto saxophone; Cesar Joaniquet on tenor and soprano saxophones, Publio Delgado on guitar, Christian Li on piano, Jeong Lim Yang on acoustic bass and Deepak Gopinath on drums
 A Room of One's Own (Inner Circle, 2013)
 with Matt Holman on trumpet, Kenji Herbert on guitar, Petros Klampanis on bass and Nathan Ellman-Bell on drums.
 City Animals (Sunnyside Records, 2018)
 with Matt Holman on trumpet, Alex LoRe on alto saxophone, Petros Klampanis on bass and Nathan Ellman-Bell on drums

Awards

References

External links 
Official site
Bandcamp site
YouTube channel

Taiwanese musicians
Jazz vibraphonists
Living people
Year of birth missing (living people)